The Tecma Medium is a French high-wing, two-place, hang glider, designed and produced by Tecma Sports of Saint-Pierre-en-Faucigny, introduced in 1985. The aircraft is supplied complete and ready-to-fly.

Design and development
The Medium was designed for flight training and passenger flights and is made from aluminum tubing, with the single-surface wing covered in 4 oz Dacron sailcloth. Its  span wing is cable braced from a single kingpost.

The sole model, the Medium 21, is named for its rough wing area in square metres. The glider model is DHV and SHV certified.

Specifications (Medium 21)

References

External links
Official website

Medium
Hang gliders